Yan Wengang (born 1 July 1997) is a Chinese skeleton racer who competed at the 2022 Winter Olympics.

Career
Yan represented China at the 2022 Winter Olympics in the men's skeleton event and won a bronze medal. This was China's first ever medal in a sliding sport at the Olympics.

References

1997 births
Living people
Chinese male skeleton racers
Olympic skeleton racers of China
Skeleton racers at the 2022 Winter Olympics
Medalists at the 2022 Winter Olympics
Olympic medalists in skeleton
Olympic bronze medalists for China